Stanley Martin Flatté (2 December 1940, Los Angeles – 4 November 2007) was a particle physicist and expert on wave propagation in atmospheric optics, ocean acoustics, and seismology.

Biography
Flatté received in 1962 a B.S. in physics from California Institute of Technology and in 1966 a Ph.D. in physics from UC Berkeley. After 5 years as a research physicist at Lawrence Berkeley Laboratory, he joined in 1971 the UC Santa Cruz faculty, where he remained until his retirement in 2004. At UCSC he was affiliated with the Santa Cruz Institute for Particle Physics, the Institute of Marine Sciences, and the Institute of Geophysics and Planetary Physics. In 1970 he joined JASON.

Upon his death, Flatté was survived by his wife, a son, a daughter, and six grandchildren.

Awards and honors
 Guggenheim Fellow (academic year 1975–1976)
 Fellow of the Optical Society of America (elected 1996)
 Fellow of the American Physical Society (elected 1997)
 Fellow of the Acoustical Society of America
 Fellow of the American Association for the Advancement of Science

References

External links
Isaac Newton: The Man — A Delphasus Lecture by Dr. Stanley M. Flatté

1940 births
2007 deaths
20th-century American physicists
Particle physicists
Theoretical physicists
California Institute of Technology alumni
University of California, Berkeley alumni
University of California, Santa Cruz faculty
Fellows of the American Physical Society
People from Los Angeles
Fellows of the Acoustical Society of America
Fellows of the American Association for the Advancement of Science